Dynamo Samara is a Russian professional bandy club in Samara, which previously has been playing in the top division Russian Bandy Super League. Until 2012 its name was TsSK VVS. The club was founded in 1942 and the club colours are white and blue.

External links
 http://www.rusbandy.ru/club/22/ (in Russian)

Bandy clubs in Russia
Bandy clubs in the Soviet Union
Sport in Samara, Russia
Bandy clubs established in 1942
1942 establishments in Russia